Presidential elections were held in Greece between 4 and 11 April 1926. At the time the country was a dictatorship under Theodoros Pangalos, who was one of the two candidates. The other, Konstantinos Demertzis, withdrew from the contest before election day, but remained on the ballot paper. Pangalos received 93.3% of the vote. However, he was removed from  office on 22 August following a counter-coup and was replaced by Pavlos Kountouriotis. It remains the only occasion on which the President of Greece was elected by the public.

Results

References

Greece
President 
1920s in Greek politics
Presidential elections in Greece
History of Greece (1924–1941)
Greece
Election and referendum articles with incomplete results